Aura Garrido Sánchez (born 29 May 1989) is a Spanish film and television actress. She has appeared in such films as Stockholm as well as the television series El ministerio del tiempo.

Early life
Garrido was born in Madrid in 1989. Her father Tomás Garrido is a composer and orchestra conductor, and her mother, Pilar Sánchez, is a painter.
She took her first piano classes when she was four years old, and soon after, started practicing ballet. She speaks English thanks to having an English-speaking best friend growing up.

After ending her high school studies, she enrolled herself in the Real Escuela Superior de Arte Dramático, in Madrid, she took interpretation until her third year, specializing in textual interpretation, but she dropped out in 2010 because she was cast for the film Planes para mañana. This role earned her the Silver Biznaga for best supporting actress and a Goya Awards nomination in the best breakthrough actress category among other nominations.

Career

In 2010 she got her first main role in the Telecinco television series La pecera de Eva. Later, she centered her career in the small screen, and formed part of the Ángel o demonio, Crematorio and Imperium casts.
She went back to working in cinema with two small roles in Promoción fantasma (2012) and El cuerpo, (2012). In 2013 she starred in Stockholm. For her performance, she won the Sant Jordi Award and a medal from the Círculo de Escritores Cinematográficos, and was nominated in the best actress category at the Goya Awards, the Feroz Awards and the Forqué Awards.

In 2014, on television again, she participated in the miniseries Hermanos and filmed Las aventuras del Capitán Alatriste although the latter was not broadcast until 2015. From 2015 through 2017, she played Amelia Folch in the Televisión Española series, El Ministerio del Tiempo.

Filmography

Film

Television

Theatre

Accolades

References

External links

Spanish television actresses
Spanish film actresses
Living people
1989 births
Actresses from Madrid
21st-century Spanish actresses